2020 Alaska Peninsula earthquake may refer to:

July 2020 Alaska Peninsula earthquake
October 2020 Alaska Peninsula earthquake